Bogotá is the capital of Colombia.

Bogota or Bogotá may also refer to:

Places

Colombia 
 Bacatá, also transliterated as Bogot(h)á, the former main settlement of the southern Muisca Confederation before the Spanish conquest
 Bogotá Province, a former province of Gran Colombia and later of the Republic of New Granada
 Bogotá savanna, a high plateau in the center of Colombia
 Metropolitan Area of Bogotá, the metropolitan area of the capital

United States
 Bogota, Illinois, an unincorporated community in Jasper County
 Bogota, New Jersey, a borough in Bergen County
 Bogota, Tennessee, a farming community in Dyer County
 Bogota (Port Republic, Virginia), a historic home and farm in Rockingham County

Rivers

Colombia
 Bogotá River, a major river of the Cundinamarca department

Geology 
 Bogotá Formation, fossil-bearing Paleocene-Eocene formation
 Bogotá Fault, major thrust fault to the east of Bogotá

Other uses
 Bogota (gunboat), a ship that served in the Colombian navy
 Bogota people, an indigenous group in Panama

See also
 Bogata (disambiguation)